St Margaret and St Andrew's Church, Littleham, Exmouth is a Grade II* listed parish church in the Church of England in Littleham, Exmouth.

History

The church is 13th century. The Drake family home was at Prattshayes, Maer Lane, and they paid for the North Aisle, known as Drakes Aisle, to be added in the 16th century. The church was heavily restored between 1883 and 1884 by Robert Medley Fulford.

Frances Nelson, wife of Lord Nelson, is buried in the churchyard.

The church is united in a single parish with Holy Trinity Church, Exmouth.

Organ

The organ is by Norman and Beard. A specification of the organ can be found on the National Pipe Organ Register.

References

Exmouth
Exmouth
Exmouth